José David Soto Peceros (born 21 March 2002) is a Peruvian footballer who plays as a left-back for UTC.

Career statistics

Club

Notes

References

2002 births
Living people
Peruvian footballers
Peru youth international footballers
Association football defenders
Peruvian Primera División players
Esther Grande footballers
Club Universitario de Deportes footballers
Cienciano footballers
Universidad Técnica de Cajamarca footballers